George Edward "Butch" Byrd (born September 20, 1941) is a former professional American football defensive back.  He started his career playing college football at Boston University. He joined the Buffalo Bills in 1964 and immediately made an impact in the defensive backfield, with seven interceptions. Byrd was also a punt returner for his entire career.

Byrd holds the Bills' career records for interceptions (40), interception return yards (666) and interceptions returned for touchdowns (5). He was a five-time American Football League All-Star, and was selected for the second-team, All-Time All-AFL. Byrd is a 1980 inductee of the Boston University Hall of Fame, LaSalle Institute Athletic Hall of Fame, Albany Capital District Hall of Fame, named to the All-Time Buffalo Bills Silver Anniversary Team in 1984, and in 2008 was selected to the Greater Buffalo Sports Hall of Fame. When he retired in 1971, he was one of thirty players with 40 interceptions (which resulted in him being tied for 15th); in the half-century since he retired, over thirty more players have joined him.

See also
List of American Football League players

References

External links 
 Byrd's citation on the Boston University Hall of Fame site
 Buffalo News story on Byrd's induction to the Greater Buffalo Sports Hall of Fame

1941 births
Living people
People from Watervliet, New York
American football cornerbacks
American football safeties
American football return specialists
Boston University Terriers football players
Buffalo Bills players
Denver Broncos players
American Football League All-Star players
American Football League All-Time Team
American Football League players